The Worshipful Company of Fishmongers (or Fishmongers' Company) is one of the 110 Livery Companies of the City of London, being an incorporated guild of sellers of fish and seafood in the City. The Company ranks fourth in the order of precedence of City Livery Companies, thereby making it one of the Great Twelve City Livery Companies.

History
The Company records an unbroken existence for 750 years, forming as City fishmongers began to collaborate for mutual benefit, developing into a guild which managed London’s fish trade according to their defined set of rules and regulation .The earliest evidence of such a group dates back to 1154, when a number of London fishmongers were fined for trading without Royal Warrant  with the Company receiving its first Royal Charter from Edward I in 1272.

The Company’s regulation of the fish trade were formalised by the 1227 Royal Charter which “secured approval of their ordinances” and was further reinforced by the 1383 Charter from King Edward III which stipulated that “anyone wishing to sell fish were required to lodge with a Fishmonger during their stay in the City”. Although Lord Mayor John Comberton de Northampton (a Draper) persuaded the City Common Council to declare that the Fishmongers should no longer have the power to monopolise trade in fish, and this was reaffirmed by Parliament, a Royal Charter granted by Richard II in 1399 restored all privileges. The same Charter states they should elect six Wardens annually, the number which continues to the present day. 

The most famous City fishmonger is Sir William Walworth, who, as Lord Mayor of London in 1381, helped bring the Peasants' Revolt to an end by stabbing the rebel Wat Tyler to death at Smithfield in the presence of King Richard II.

In the early 17th century, the Company was granted lands at Ballykelly and Banagher in modern-day Northern Ireland, by the Crown. It remained a major landowner there until the 20th century, and the villages contain some of the most interesting buildings erected in Ulster by the Plantation companies.

In 1714, the Irish actor Thomas Doggett provided money to endow a boat race called Doggett's Coat and Badge Race in honour of the new king, George I of Hanover. The race was originally to be rowed annually on 1 August on the River Thames, by up to six young watermen per boat who were not to be out of their apprenticeship by more than twelve months. The prize for the champion oarsman is a fine red coat embellished with a large silver badge on one arm, depicting the White Horse of Hanover with the word 'liberty' underneath. Since Doggett's death, the Fishmongers' Company continues to organise this event each year, and it is now believed to be the world's longest continuously-running sporting event as well as being the longest boat race in the world – 4 miles, 5 furlongs (7,400 m).

Functions
The Company is governed by its Prime Warden, five other Wardens and its Court of Assistants, comprising 28 appointed Livery members. The Company comprises about 700 members, including a good representation of from the seafood trade, UK fisheries and marine and freshwater conservation. Liverymen of all City companies are members of Common Hall which entitles them to vote each year in the election of the Lord Mayor of the City of London. 

The Company’s Fisheries Charitable Trust maintains its link with its namesake trade, working to “build and safeguard a prosperous and sustainable fishing industry, for the benefit of those engaged in it, the environment and our island nation”. Supporting a range of projects across UK fisheries, the Trust works with universities, government and third sector organisations to support, through charitable giving, a sustainable fishing industry, healthy rivers and oceans and thriving coastal communities.

The Company’s Charitable Trust responds to a range of social issues, focusing on mental health, food and nutrition and education in prisons.It has also long supported the City and Guilds of London Art School and the City and Guilds of London Institute.

Hall 

The Company's livery hall in the City of London is known as Fishmongers' Hall (sometimes shortened in common parlance to Fish Hall); its earliest recorded hall was built in 1310. A new hall, on the present site, was bequeathed to the Company in 1434. Together with 43 other Livery halls, this one was destroyed in the Great Fire of London in 1666 and a replacement hall designed by the architect Edward Jerman opened in 1671. This hall by Jerman was demolished to facilitate the construction of the new London Bridge in 1827. The Fishmongers' next hall was designed by Henry Roberts (although his assistant, later the celebrated Sir Gilbert Scott, made the drawings) and built by William Cubitt & Company, opening in 1827. After severe bomb damage during the Blitz, Fishmongers' Hall was restored by Austen Hall (of Whinney, Son & Austen Hall) and reopened in 1951.

Gresham's School
Since 1555, the Company has acted as the Trustee of Gresham's School in Holt, Norfolk, in accordance with the wishes of Lord Mayor Sir John Gresham (1492–1556), who endowed the school to the Company upon his death. Among other responsibilities, the Company now focuses on providing "life changing" bursaries for students.

List of Prime Wardens

c. 1370: Sir William Walworth
1664: Abraham Johnson
1676: William Allington
1721–22: Sir John Fryer
1810–12: Richard "Conversation" Sharp, MP
1834–36: Sir Matthew Wood
1863–64: William Cubitt (et al. George Cubitt, 1st Baron Ashcombe)
1874–75: William Lawrence
1880-81: Jethro Hornblower
1883–84: Thomas Dakin, Lord Mayor
1887–88: Sir Andrew Lusk
1888–89: James Clarke Lawrence
1893-94: John Warren
1899-1900: Richard Biddulph Martin
1901–02: George Frederick Bodley
1902: Edward Rawlings
1921-22: Lothian Demain Nicholson
1925-26: Lothian Demain Nicholson
1961–62: Prince Philip, Duke of Edinburgh
1969–70: Sir John Carew Pole
1972–73: David Cairns, 5th Earl Cairns
1977–78: Kenneth Mackay, 3rd Earl of Inchcape
1989–90: Robert Kindersley, 3rd Baron Kindersley
1995–96: Alexander McDonnell, 9th Earl of Antrim
1998–99: Simon Lennox-Boyd, 2nd Viscount Boyd of Merton
2000–01: Merlin Hay, 24th Earl of Erroll
2001–02: Sir Thomas Stockdale
2014–15: James  FCA
2017–18 : Princess Anne, The Princess Royal
2019–20: David Jones DL
2020-2022: Sir Alan Yarrow
2022-2023: Charles Spicer

Company Church
 St Magnus the Martyr

Arms

See also
Fishmonger
Shellfish Association of Great Britain
Gresham College
Livery Company

Sources

External links

 
 Fishmongers' Hall and Fish Street Hill at www.british-history.ac.uk
 Gresham's School Official site

1272 establishments in England
1537 establishments in England
Livery companies
Companies of medieval England
Charities based in London
Corporatism
Great Twelve City Livery Companies
Worshipful
Prime Wardens of the Worshipful Company of Fishmongers